= The Knowledge Academy =

Education and training company

The Knowledge Academy Limited
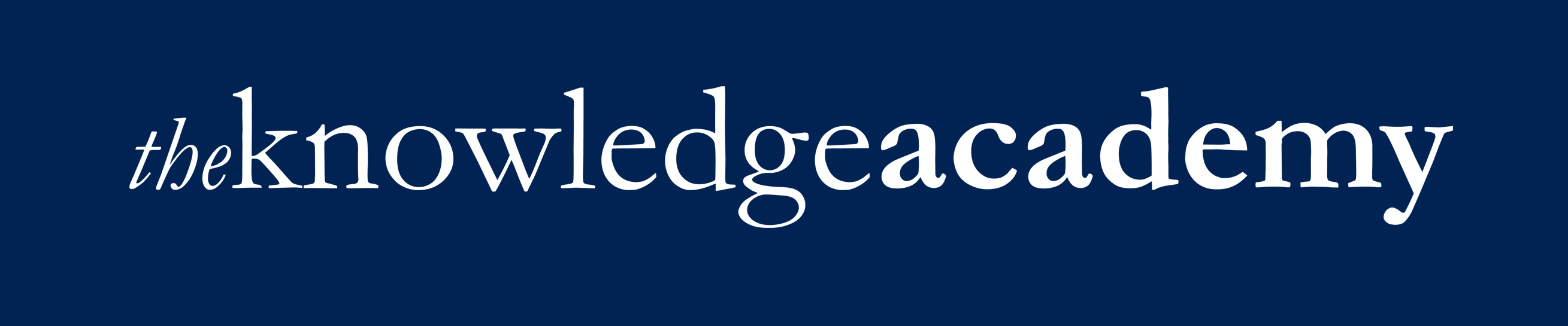
- Company type: Private company
- Industry: Professional development
- Founded: 2009; 17 years ago
- Headquarters: Berkshire, United Kingdom
- Revenue: £69.27m (2025)
- Net income: £13.75m (2025)
- Owner: Dilshad and Barinder Hothi
- Number of employees: 187
- Website: theknowledgeacademy.com

The Knowledge Academy is a UK-based global training company. They provide IT, business management and project management training for individuals and organisations.

== History ==
The Knowledge Academy was formed in 2009 by husband and wife Dilshad and Barinder Hothi. The Knowledge Academy offers both classroom and online professional training courses.

== Founders ==
Dilshad Hothi originally grew up in India and came to the UK at aged 21 to complete his master's degree in marketing. He then joined a large training provider and was a director of Sales there for a number of years before starting The Knowledge Academy with his wife Barinder in 2009. Barinder also worked in Technology Sales, working for Microsoft and IBM.

== Daily Mirror investigation ==
In 2016 the Daily Mirror carried out an investigation into the company's practices. It revealed how The Knowledge Academy can, at its discretion, "change prices at any time", "cancel or reschedule any course" and swap their courses for a "Virtual Training" alternative. They were also found to be re-selling a course run by a rival company, without their knowledge.
